Talk a Good Game is the fourth studio album by American singer Kelly Rowland. Formerly titled Year of the Woman, the album was released on June 14, 2013 through Universal Republic and its affiliated record labels. Incorporating a base core of R&B and pop music, Talk a Good Game was influenced by the likes of Whitney Houston, Marvin Gaye and Stevie Wonder amongst other of Rowland's idols. Rowland wanted the album to be a celebration of womanhood and referred to the record as her most personal album to date. On the album, she co-wrote all but one song, "Freak", a cover of the same 2010 song by entertainer Jamie Foxx from his fourth studio album Best Night of My Life. A deluxe edition, and Target-exclusive edition of the album featuring bonus tracks, was released simultaneously alongside the twelve-track standard edition.

Talk a Good Game was promoted with live renditions of the album's songs during the Lights Out Tour, a co-headline concert tour between Rowland and The-Dream. The album was also preceded by the release of the lead single, a Mike Will Made It and Marz production called "Kisses Down Low" which peaked in the top-thirty of the US Billboard Hot R&B/Hip-Hop Songs chart.  A second single, The-Dream-produced "Dirty Laundry", was released a month before the album. The song  talks about the domestic abuse that Rowland suffered during a previous relationship.

Upon its release, music critics commended the album's cohesive sound and themes throughout, often noting Rowland's most personal and vulnerable lyrics as well as the strength of her vocals. Talk a Good Game debuted at number four on the US Billboard 200 selling 68,000 copies in its opening week, becoming Rowland's third top ten album. The album also debuted at number four on the US R&B/Hip-Hop Albums Chart. In 2014, Rowland parted ways with her label, wanting a new start elsewhere and signalling the end of the Talk a Good Game era; the album was her only release under Republic Records.

Background 
Work on Rowland's fourth studio album reportedly began in 2011, after the release of her third studio album Here I Am. In March 2012, Lonny Bereal told Kempire Radio that the album would see Rowland returning to her R&B roots. "She's going in so hard with the R&B. Of course, she is going to give the Pop crowd what they're looking for. But, she really is returning to R&B on this album. Her delivery is real confident now. It's definitely a new Kelly Rowland. She wouldn't even let me put autotune on her voice this time round. She was like 'No, I want people to really get me'." The following month, Rowland told MTV News that the album would have a theme and that she had been documenting the recording process of the album for her fans to see. During an interview with Vegas magazine in June 2012, she described the album as a dedication to "my ladies". She explained, "I want to tell women how incredible we are, how our intuition is so spot-on. Sometimes we don't listen to it, but it is the thing that can actually make us happier." Rowland cited Whitney Houston, Marvin Gaye, and Stevie Wonder as the album's inspirations.

In August 2011, producer Rico Love told Rap-Up magazine, "While she's on tour, I'm gonna be writing records for her new album. We can kinda roll that out and drop her new single in late spring. Excited about that." Love also said that he wanted to continue developing an R&B sound with Rowland, following the US chart success of her single "Motivation" (2011), which he co-wrote and co-produced. "I believe in R&B and I believe that if we make new age records and don't make dated records and keep it classic, I think we'll be fine." Rowland also worked with Amber "Se7en" Streeter, Da Internz, Eric Bellinger, Eric Hudson, Kevin Cossom, Lonny Bereal, Nikeshia Briscoe, Redd Stylez, Rock City,  T-Minus, Rodney "Darkchild" Jerkins, The Runners and Beau Vallis. On March 23, 2012, Rowland confirmed via Twitter that she was working with rapper T-Pain. Sean Garrett revealed in an interview with Rap-Up on May 9, 2012 that he also contributed to the album. He stated, "Her swag is dope and I'm just so happy to see her get her shot. I'ma do what I can to make sure Kelly right." In August 2012, Grammy-winning songwriter Diane Warren mentioned her involvement, stating that she had been working with Rowland "because Beyoncé was telling her to get together with me".

In November 2012, Rowland revealed she had been working with production duo Jimmy Jam and Terry Lewis. Speaking of their collaboration to Billboards Keith Caulfield, she said "Let me tell you something, they are a part of the foundation of who I am ... Because their sound was one of the first things I remember about R&B. Being in the studio with them, I wanted to pinch myself." However, it was later revealed that the songs she recorded with Jam and Lewis did not make the album. In February 2013, Rowland revealed that she had over fifty songs recorded for the album that she was continuously working on to put together the final collection. Rowland also worked with The-Dream, Pharrell Williams and Boi-1da. According to USA Today in April 2013, rapper Pusha T would make an appearance on the album. In April 2013, Rowland revealed she had over 70 songs to choose from, amongst a feature vocal from Lil Wayne, the album features Wiz Khalifa and a duet with Pharrell Williams. Additionally Rowland reunited with former Destiny's Child bandmates Beyoncé and Michelle Williams for a song on the album, Rowland stressed that it was not a Destiny's Child reunion but rather a song by herself featuring Beyoncé and Williams.

Musical style, writing and composition 
Talk a Good Game was inspired by R&B artists New Edition, Pebbles, and Babyface, Rowland spoke on the album's musical direction saying "[It] feels like everything I wanted to make as far as music and R&B, I wanted to make sure my roots were really pronounced on this album." Rowland cited Whitney Houston, Marvin Gaye, and Stevie Wonder as the album's inspirations.

The album opens with "Freak", an electro-R&B song that was originally recorded by American entertainer Jamie Foxx for his album Best Night of My Life (2010) It references Michael Jackson's "Thriller" as well as including a spoken bridge towards the end. Then comes "Kisses Down Low", an R&B and electronic track written by Marquel Middlebrooks, Timothy and Theron Thomas, Rowland, Mike Will Made It, with the latter producing the song. Rap-Up described the song as a "bedroom banger", whilst Billboards Andrew Hampp described the song as an "unofficial" sequel to Rowland's most successful and sexually explicit single, 2010's "Motivation" (featuring Lil Wayne). Third in the album, is the adult contemporary-influenced "Gone", which features hip-hop rapper Wiz Khalifa. Harmony Samuels produced the "base-heavy" and radio friendly "snapping" beat which features a prominent sample of "Big Yellow Taxi", a 1970 single by Canadian singer-songwriter Joni Mitchell. It lyrically speaks about a "man who played with her heart" and how "she's done putting up with his games". Lyrics from Rowland include "There's a million ways that I could tell you / But I think I would rather show you that it's over / And I won't be back no more", whilst Khalifa raps "I been here before / And you know Kelly never lied / So you can get your stuff / And get to going / I'll get back to getting high".

The album is named after track four, "Talk a Good Game" which features Kevin Cossom. Over a "snaky but sweet" production from T-Minus Rowland sings "I don't think I can take another broken promise / Why do things the hard way when you can just be honest". Hampp stated that Cossom's rap gave the song a "street edge". It takes the listener on an emotional journey according to The Honesty Hour. The next song, "Down on Love", is a mid-tempo production featuring another classic sample, this time the 1987 song "Rock Steady" by R&B group The Whispers. Using her mezzo-soprano vocals, Rowland takes on a downtrodden romantic situation, "We want two different things at two different times / You know how the story go / Easy come easy go". "Dirty Laundry" was co-written by Rowland, Carlos McKinney and The Dream, and is R&B "confessional" ballad, containing "R&B jam spools" and a piano-led melody. It details a "frank and often poignant commentary" on Rowland's life. The song is a "brutal" chronicle of the last ten years of Rowland's life, covering her envy of Beyoncé's solo success and the end of an abusive relationship. Amongst the lyrics, Rowland sings "Kinda lucky I was in her shadow / Phone call from my sister what's the matter / She said, 'Oh no / You gotta leave' / I'm on the kitchen floor / He took the keys."

This moves onto another track called "You Changed" that features her former Destiny's Child bandmates Beyoncé and Michelle Williams. Lyrically the song talks about a relationship that has gone "awry". Rowland takes prominence on the track, though Beyoncé and Williams each get their "own cathartic verse to go off on a clueless ex". The Honesty Hour compared "You Changed" to the 2004 Destiny's Child single "Girl". Production on the album then moves on to a light mid-tempo dance track on "I Remember", which was produced by The Runners. Atop a "tinkling piano and propulsive dance beat", Rowland's "characteristically soulful vocals" can be heard. Hampp said that the song incorporated tribal music and a vibe that "consciously stops short of being a full-on four-on-the-floor banger." According to the Honesty Hour, "I Remember" remains firmly a ballad, but incorporates elements of techno and EDM. Rowland dabbles in some 80's funk pop on the Boi-1da and Matthew Burnett-produced "Red Wine". The song features dreamy synths and a soaring chorus, in a vintage throwback. It was compared to songs by Brandy Norwood. The pace continues on the romantic "This is Love" which focuses on a guy that "got [Rowland] goin' on cloud 9". Over the light production, Rowland sings "I'm waiting and anticipating for you to give it to me / Boy I'm trying to hold it inside / Heart racing, my body shaking / 'Cause when you give it to me, boy you are the truth, I can't lie." According to the Honesty Hour, "This is Love" had crossover appear for both R&B and pop radio.

"Street Life" sees Rowland opt for a "no BS" attitude. She sings about how "chasing fast money takes precedence over self-improvement" atop a mid-2000s pop music production, built around layers of hand drums and horn stabs. It was produced by Pharrell Williams and opens with Rowland saying "Ooh 'dere go my baby daddy!". The lyrics then continue on to speak about the current problems society is facing, "the recession ate me alive / Tryin' to get where the breeze is nice / So I can breathe." She then goes on to speak about social issues and the breakdown of society on lyrics like "coming from the street life we know it's letting go / We like to go to school for education / But the street life we know don't write no notes / It's like parole with the time we're facing." Pusha T appears in the song's middle 8 where he raps about honor and US president Barack Obama, "this is for my niggas with them four baby mamas...this Presidential Rollie don't make me Obama / so don't judge me by my jewelry, please your honor". The Huffington Post described "Street Life" as a departure from Rowland's previous "softer sound". The standard edition of the album finishes with "Stand in Front of Me", a 50's doo-wop inspired "ode to love". The simple production and lyrics include the lines "You just do it / Mean it / Prove it"; Hampp of Billboard said you can expect to hear the song at weddings.

Release and promotion 

On October 10, 2012, Rowland announced on her official website that the album would be called Year of the Woman, and wrote that it "is one of my greatest pieces of work and I cannot wait to share it with you guys!". During an interview with Billboard magazine in November 2012, Rowland spoke about the type of songs she had been recording for the album, saying "With the things that I'm talking about, I think that it's probably the most vulnerable I've been on a record. And I wanted to just touch a woman's hand, talk to her, you know what I mean? Like, this is my sister and I think that's one of the things that I wanted to really pronounce on this album, is a celebration of a woman." During a back stage interview at the 55th Annual Grammy Awards, Rowland revealed that working with so many producers inspired her to rename the album Talk a Good Game. The album was originally due for release from June 3, 2013 however, during an interview with The Madd Hatta Morning Show on 97.9 Box FM, Rowland revealed that the album had been pushed back to June 18, 2013 The album was made available to pre-order on May 21, 2013, ahead of its June 18, 2013 US release. In August 2013, vocal producer Lonny Bereal said that Rowland was working on new music, including songs produced by Bereal, for a re-release of Talk a Good Game. In March 2014, Rowland confirmed that she had left Republic Records in search of a "fresh start" and that she had already begun work on her next studio album, signalling the end of the Talk a Good Game era.

In June 2012, it was announced that the Sean Garrett-penned song "Ice", which features rapper Lil Wayne, would serve as the album's first single. "Ice" is the third collaboration between Rowland and Wayne, following the Destiny's Child collaboration "Soldier" (2004), and her solo single "Motivation". It was sent to urban radio in the United States on August 14, 2012, and was released via iTunes Stores from August 24, 2012. "Ice" reached number 24 on the US Hot R&B/Hip-Hop Songs chart, number 88 on the US Billboard Hot 100 chart, and number 25 on the South Korea Gaon International Chart. Upon unveiling the track listing it was revealed that "Ice" would not feature on the album.

Rowland performed in support of Talk a Good Game at the RiverFest 2013, on May 25, 2013 in Little Rock, Arkansas. Here, Rowland performed "Dirty Laundry" live for the first time. Rowland performed "Dirty Laundry" live for the second time on May 26, 2013, during the opening date of her co-headline tour with The-Dream, the Lights Out Tour. On May 28, 2013, Rowland visited The Raheem DaVaughn Show on BLIS.fm, where she premiered "You Changed", her collaboration with Beyoncé and Michelle Williams, as well as "Gone" featuring Wiz Khalifa and "Talk a Good Game" featuring Kevin Cossom.

On April 30, 2013, it was confirmed that Rowland would be co-headlining a US concert tour alongside The-Dream, who produced two songs on Talk a Good Game. Speaking about the tour, Rowland said: "To be able to work with [The-Dream] in this capacity and have the opportunity to showcase our new music to our fans live and in person is going to be extremely rewarding! I can't wait.". The Lights Out Tour was originally scheduled to have twenty-two shows, but this was later changed to five, after Rowland was forced to cancel many of the shows because she signed on to become a judge on The X Factor US. The tour kicked off on May 26, 2013 in Washington, D.C. and ended on June 2, 2013 in Mashantucket.

Singles
The album's first single, "Kisses Down Low", made its worldwide premiere on January 18, 2013, and was released via iTunes Stores on February 1, 2013. The single impacted US urban radio on February 5, 2013, and US rhythmic radio on March 26, 2013. In the United States "Kisses Down Low" debuted at number 96 on the Billboard Hot 100 for the issue dated March 10, 2013. On its third week the song peaked at number 72.

On May 9, 2013, Rowland released a teaser for the album's The-Dream-penned second single "Dirty Laundry". The minute-long clip featured a scene from a laundromat. The song premiered on May 15, 2013 and was released for digital download on May 21, 2013. The track begins during a "rough period" of time after the release of her debut album Simply Deep (2002). In the lyrics, Rowland confronts a mixture of emotions that she experienced over former bandmate Beyoncé's post-Destiny's Child success; emotions including resentment and job. The second half of the song discusses an abusive past relationship. It was officially sent to US urban radio on May 15, 2013, and to US rhythmic radio on July 30, 2013. On August 7, 2013, Rowland announced that "Gone" featuring Wiz Khalifa would be released as the album's third single. However, in March 2014, it was confirmed that Rowland had left Republic Records for a new start and already started work on her fifth album, signalling the end of the Talk a Good Game era.

Critical reception 

Upon release, Talk a Good Game has received mostly positive reviews. According to Metacritic, where they assign a weighted average score out of 100 to ratings and reviews from selected mainstream critics, the album received an average of 65, based on 12 reviews. Kyle Kramer from the Chicago's RedEye entertainment newspaper called Talk a Good Game a "fantastically bold re-introduction for those who haven't checked in on Rowland in a decade." He noted that although at times Rowland experiments with adult contemporary music (on "Gone" featuring Wiz Khalifa) the majority of albums sits "between post-Drake R&B and "high energy highlights". Kramer concluded by calling Talk a Good Game a risk-taking project, which "as a result, [is] the right [move]." In writing for VH1, Felicia Dennis and Samantha Friedman said that upon hearing the album, every song could have been a single. AllMusic's Andy Kellman said that Talk a Good Game was a similar make-up of pop and R&B music, like Rowland's releases. He described the album as full of "satisfying, if mostly unexciting, material", comparing it to Here I Am (2011) except for the lack of dance-pop songs on the new album.

Jim Farber from The New York Daily News featured that the "90s-style R&B might keep [Rowland] from receiving the mainstream appeal of her peers". Aside from "Dirty Laundry", what Farber called "a tad desperate" as the message gets lost in the melody, he thought the album "has a focused sound, based on the slow grind. As on many of Rowland's most effective songs of the past, her latest keep the center of gravity low. The songs let her slippery voice slide over loping, bass-driven beats." The Boston Globes Sarah Rodman agreed that when people looked beyond "Dirty Laundry", the album "reflects a better balance of sound and sentiment". In writing for Slant Magazine, Annie Galvin awarded the album three out of five stars. Commenting that "Rowland is still grappling with how to create an authentic artistic identity," Galvin concluded that "Talk a Good Games standout tracks prove that she's closer to carving a niche for herself than she has been on prior efforts that suppressed rather than addressed that difficulty."

Spins Julianne Shepherd wrote that Talk a Good Game was "a slive above Here I Am". In the review Shepherd said "Rowland is good at anything, it's being bona fide through and through. She's an extremely likable figure in pop music, more relatable than her goddess-sis Beyoncé, more down-to-earth lyrically than many of her R&B peers. Talk a Good Game is her realness in full flower, an album that balances world-weariness about relationships with infectious dollops of sexual agency, tackling the vagaries of love almost exclusively and offering anthems for experiences that every woman has had (or will have) at some point." Andrew Hampp from Billboard agreed in his track-by-track review. Hampp said "Kelly Rowland finally comes into her own on 'Talk a Good Game' her most focused, consistent and honest album to date. Picking up where 2011's 'Here I Am' left off, the singer's new album has an additional layer of honesty and openness courtesy ... the album is still a refreshing hyper-focus on contemporary R&B." Vibes Kathy Iandoli also agreed, saying that "Talk a Good Game sets her far apart from the status quo of mass-produced R&B ... Kelly finally knows who she is and how she'd like to sound." "Rowland finally hits her stride," is what Robert Copsey said in his review for Digital Spy, where he also called the album "a collection of classy and sophisticated R&B".

Accolades

Commercial performance 
On June 23, 2013, Talk a Good Game opened on the UK R&B Albums Chart at number seven, besting previous album Here I Am (2011) by one chart position. However, on the UK Albums Chart, Talk a Good Game failed to match Here I Ams peak position of forty-three, only managing to debut at number eighty. As a result, it became Rowland's lowest charting album in the UK to date. In the US, Talk a Good Game debuted on the Billboard 200 chart at number four, having sold 68,000 copies; it became Rowland's third top-ten album, though sold 9,000 copies fewer than Here I Am. Talk a Good Game also debuted at number four on the Top R&B/Hip-Hop Albums, failing to match Here I Ams peak of number one. In its second week, the album dropped to number 11. As of December 2013, Talk a Good Game has sold 215,000 copies worldwide.

 Track listing Notes and sample credits
 signifies a co-producer.
 signifies a vocal producer.
 signifies an additional producer.
"Gone" contains an interpolation "Big Yellow Taxi" (1970), as written and performed by Joni Mitchell.
"Down on Love" samples a portion of "Rock Steady" (1987) by The Whispers.

 Personnel 
Adapted from Allmusic and album liner.Kelly Rowland — Talk a Good Game. [Album Booklet]. Republic Records (Universal Music Group). Catalog Number: 602537415168.

Recording locations

Jungle City Studios (New York City, New York)
The Hit Factory (Miami, Florida)
Circle House Studios (Miami, Florida)
Eardrums Studios (Dallas, Texas)

Glenwood Place Studios (Burbank, California)
South Beach Studios (Miami Beach, Florida)
Setai Recording Studios (Miami, Florida)VocalsKelly Rowland – lead vocals
Kevin Cossom – featured artist, background vocals
Rock City background vocals
Rico Love – background vocals
Beyoncé – featured artist
Pusha T – featured artist
Michelle Williams – featured artist
Wiz Khalifa – featured artistManagerial and creative credits
Chelsea Avery – Artist and repertoire (A&R)
Georges Antoni – photographer
Sandy Brummels – creative director
Tab Nkhereanye – A&R
Lynn M. Scott – marketing manager
Todd Tourso – package designer
Yu Tsai – cover photo creator, photographer
Tim Weatherspoon – executive producerTechnical'

David Anderson – songwriter, keyboards, producer
Jon-David "J.D. Anderson" – keyboards, songwriter, producer
Marcella "Ms Lago" Araica – mixing technician, songwriter
Diego Avendaño – assistant engineer
Lonny Bereal – vocal producer
Adam Beyrer – vocal engineer
Lee Blaske – Keyboards
Matthew Burnett – songwriter, instrumentation, producer, programming
Noel Cadastre – mixing
Andrew Coleman – digital arrangement, digital editing, engineer
Kevin Cossom – songwriter, vocal producer
Tom Coyne – mastering
"Ben Billions" Diehl – producer, songwriter
Jimmy Douglass – mixing
Hart Gunther – engineer
Andy Haller – engineer
Andrew Harr – songwriter
Courtney Harrell – songwriter
Trehy Harris – assistant, mixing assistant
Floyd Nathaniel Hills (Danja) – songwriter, producer
Todd Hurtt – assistant engineer
Jermaine Jackson – songwriter
Brandon Jones – assistant engineer
Jaycen Joshua – mixing technician
Chris Kahn – assistant engineer
Carlos King – engineer
Mike Larson – engineer
Richard "Rico Love" Butler – songwriter, producer

Carlos "Los da Mystro" McKinney – songwriter, producer
Jeremy McArthur – songwriter, drums, keyboards, producer, programming
Thurston McCrea – vocal engineer
Aya Merrill – mastering
Marquel "Marz" Middlebrooks – songwriter, producer
Joni Mitchell – songwriter
Thabiso Nkhereanye – songwriter
Terius "The-Dream" Nash – songwriter, producer
Scott Naughton – engineer
Jesus Rodriguez – assistant engineer
Kelly Rowland – songwriter, executive producer
The Runners – producers
Harmony Samuels – songwriter, producer
Matthew "Boi-1da" Samuels – instrumentation, producer, programming, songwriter
Bart Schoudel – engineer
Travis Sewchan – mixing assistant
Amber Streeter – songwriter
Myariah "Jane Handcock" Summers – songwriter
Stacie Orrico - Vocals, songwriter
Theron & Timothy Thomas – songwriters
Cameron "Wiz Khalifa" Thomaz – songwriter
Terrence "Pusha T" Thorton – songwriter
Beau Vallis – engineer, vocal engineer
Julian Vasquez – engineer
Jeff "Supa Jeff" Villanueva – Pro-Tools
Michael Williams (Mike Will Made It) – songwriter, producer
Pharrell Williams – songwriter, producer
Tyler "T-Minus" Williams – songwriter, producer

Charts

Weekly charts

Year-end charts

Release history

References

External links 
 

2013 albums
Kelly Rowland albums
Republic Records albums
Albums produced by The-Dream
Albums produced by Boi-1da
Albums produced by T-Minus (record producer)
Albums produced by Pharrell Williams
Albums produced by the Runners
Albums produced by Mike Will Made It
Albums produced by Danja (record producer)
Albums produced by Rico Love
Albums produced by Harmony Samuels